United Nations Security Council Resolution 477, adopted unanimously on July 30, 1980, after examining the application of Zimbabwe for membership in the United Nations, the Council recommended to the General Assembly that Zimbabwe be admitted. The Republic of Zimbabwe was officially admitted as the 153rd member of the UN on 25 August 1980 by the General Assembly acting on the recommendation by the Security Council.  Minister Robert Mugabe was on hand to accept membership on behalf of the Zimbabwean government.

See also
 List of United Nations member states
 List of United Nations Security Council Resolutions 401 to 500 (1976–1982)

References

External links
 
Text of the Resolution at undocs.org

 0477
 0477
 0477
1980 in Zimbabwe
July 1980 events